Willem Kieft (September 1597 – September 27, 1647) was a Dutch merchant and the Director of New Netherland (of which New Amsterdam was the capital) from 1638 to 1647.

Life and career

Willem Kieft was appointed to the rank of director by the Dutch West India Company in 1638. He formed the council of twelve men, the first representative body in New Netherland, but ignored its advice.

He tried to tax, and then, drive out, local Native Americans. He ordered attacks on Pavonia and Corlears Hook on February 25, 1643 in a massacre (129 Dutch soldiers killed 120 Indians, including women and children). The Dutch local citizen advisory group had been specifically against such a raid, and were aghast when they heard the details. "Infants were torn from their mother's breasts, and hacked to pieces in the presence of their parents, and pieces thrown into the fire and in the water, and other sucklings, being bound to small boards, were cut, stuck, and pierced, and miserably massacred in a manner to move a heart of stone. Some were thrown into the river, and when the fathers and mothers endeavored to save them, the soldiers would not let them come on land but made both parents and children drown". This was followed by retaliations resulting in what would become known as Kieft's War (1643–1645). The war took a huge toll on both sides, and Dutch West India Company Board of Directors fired him in 1647. He was replaced with Peter Stuyvesant.

He died on September 27, 1647 in the Princess Amelia shipwreck near Swansea, Wales, en route to Amsterdam to defend himself, along with many of his opponents, including the Rev. Everardus Bogardus.  His archive was also lost, so his exact role cannot be established apart from what his opponents wrote of him. He is depicted in the Gods of Manhattan series by Scott Mebus.

See also
 Land of the Blacks (Manhattan)
 Colonial America
 Dutch colonization of the Americas
 Dutch Empire
 List of colonial governors of New Jersey
 List of colonial governors of New York

References

Further reading
William Elliot Griffis The Story of New Netherland. The Dutch In America. (Chapter IX.  Cambridge: The Riverside Press. 1909)
Allen Johnson, Ed. Dutch and English on the Hudson (Chapter IV. New Haven: Yale University Press. 1919)
Jaap Jacobs (2005), New Netherland: A Dutch Colony in Seventeenth-Century America. Leiden: Brill Academic Publishers, .
Journal of New Netherland 1647. Written in the Years 1641, 1642, 1643, 1644, 1645, and 1646. 1641–1647.

1597 births
1647 deaths
17th-century Dutch businesspeople
People of the Province of New York
Businesspeople from Amsterdam
Directors of New Netherland
Colonial American merchants
Kieft's War
Deaths due to shipwreck at sea
Accidental deaths in Wales